John Andrew Pearson may refer to:

 John A. Pearson, Canadian architect
 John Andrew Pearson (Royal Navy officer)